The Fiendish Plot of Dr. Fu Manchu is a 1980 comedy film. It was the final film featuring star Peter Sellers and David Tomlinson. Based on characters created by Sax Rohmer, the film stars Sellers in the dual role of Fu Manchu, a megalomaniacal Chinese evil genius, and English country gentleman detective Nayland Smith.

Pre-production began with Richard Quine as director. By the time production commenced, Piers Haggard had replaced him. Sellers handled the re-shoots himself. Released two weeks after Sellers' death, the film was a commercial and critical failure. It was also the final screen appearance for Tomlinson, who retired from acting shortly before its release.

Plot
The film's opening titles announce it is set "possibly around 1933." The story concerns the 168-year-old Fu Manchu, who must duplicate the ingredients to the elixir vitae that extends his life after the original is accidentally destroyed by one of his minions.

When the Star of Leningrad diamond is stolen by a clockwork spider from a Soviet exhibition in Washington D.C., the FBI sends a pair of special agents (agents Pete Williams and Joe Capone) to London, in order to seek the assistance of Scotland Yard as a card from Fu Manchu's organisation, the Si-Fan, has been left at the crime. Sir Roger Avery of the Yard feels this is a job for Fu's nemesis, Sir Denis Nayland Smith, now retired.

Nayland Smith correctly surmises that Fu Manchu will steal the missing diamond's identical twin, held among the Crown Jewels of the United Kingdom in the Tower of London. Smith also predicts that Fu will be thwarted by the tight security (several aged Beefeaters) at the Tower, then will kidnap Queen Mary to gain the jewel. He recruits Alice Rage, a female police constable, to impersonate the Queen and fool Fu's gang. Rage is soon captured by Fu, but the plan backfires somewhat when she falls in love with her captor. She switches sides and willingly helps Fu.

The Crown Jewels are guarded by Sir Nules Thudd, an obese Chinese-cuisine-loving glutton. Thudd has obesity-related health problems, and has been ordered by the doctor to walk around for  a day on stilts. He is promised access to Fu's outdoor restaurant of Chinese food, and in return, he helps the Si-Fan steal the diamond. Fu steals the rest of the Crown Jewels as well.

Nayland Smith then uses his flying country house, The Spirit of Wiltshire, to transport himself and his fellow officers all the way to Fu Manchu's mountain base in the Himalayas. Meanwhile, Fu has recreated the elixir vitae, only to find that it has no effect on him – one of the ingredients used was faulty.

Nayland Smith's country house is soon besieged by an army of Si-Fan. Nayland Smith demands an audience with Fu, and is transported to his old enemy, who is in poor health by this point. Nayland Smith reveals that he has hidden the real diamond. Fu offers to return the Crown Jewels in exchange for the diamond. Once Nayland Smith hands over the diamond, Fu has a new elixir vitae prepared for him. Fu becomes young and vibrant again.

Fu willingly hands over the Crown Jewels to Nayland Smith's allies. He also has a diamond identical to the Star of Leningrad handed over to Capone, arguing that the Russians will not see any difference. In a private meeting, Fu expresses his appreciation of Nayland Smith, who has been the only worthy adversary of his life. He offers Nayland Smith part of the elixir vitae, but asks him not to drink it until he returns to London. Fu warns Nayland Smith that his latest fiendish plot will wipe out his enemies.

Nayland Smith rejoins his fellow officers in time to see a rejuvenated Fu Manchu sporting an Elvis Presley-type jumpsuit. Fu rises from the floor, and his cohorts now form a rock band. They sing the song "Rock-a-Fu", as the story ends.

Cast

Sellers also appears in an uncredited cameo as a Mexican bandito.

Background
Sellers had previously recorded a 1955 Goon Show entitled "The Terrible Revenge of Fred Fu-Manchu" set in 1895. In the film, his Fu insists friends call him "Fred" and that he had once been the groundsman at Eton.

In addition to Sellers, the film features Sid Caesar as FBI agent Joe Capone, David Tomlinson as Scotland Yard Commissioner Sir Roger Avery, Simon Williams as his bumbling nephew and Helen Mirren as Police Constable Alice Rage (Mirren sings the Music Hall standard, "Daddy Wouldn't Buy Me a Bow Wow").

Burt Kwouk, Sellers' co-star in The Pink Panther films with the character of Cato, makes a brief cameo appearance as a Fu Manchu minion who accidentally destroys the elixir vitae, prompting the joke that Fu thinks he looks familiar. John Le Mesurier, who appeared opposite Sellers in the original Pink Panther and [[The Magic Christian (film)|The Magic Christian]], has a small part in the film as Smith's butler, and Steve Franken, who played the tipsy waiter opposite Sellers in The Party, returns as an FBI agent.

Unlike other Fu Manchu works, Fu's daughter Fah Lo Suee, and Nayland Smith's friend Dr. Petrie do not appear in the film.

Production
In 1976, Robert Kaufman was writing the script for Fu Manchu to star Peter Sellers and Michael Caine.

Production was troublesome before filming started, with two directors—Richard Quine and John Avildsen—both fired before the script had been completed. Sellers also expressed dissatisfaction with his own portrayal of Manchu with his ill-health often causing delays. Arguments between Sellers and director Piers Haggard led to Haggard's firing at Sellers's instigation and Sellers taking over, with his long-time friend David Lodge directing some sequences.

The filming days were quite tense, with Sellers intervening in practically the entire production of the film, despite his health problems. Haggard later recalled:
It was a very disagreeable experience on that film. I was brought in on an off-chance. He [Sellers]'d agreed to do a fairly stock Hollywood comedy thriller, similar to The Pink Panther really, playing a detective and a villain. And he'd fallen out of love with that project and didn’t want to do that script. They said, 'Okay, what do you want to do?' and he said, 'Let me go off and do a bit of rewriting.' So he went off with a Hollywood hack and turned it into a series of Goon Show sketches. The executives were absolutely appalled. They thought, 'Oh my God, we thought he had a picture and now we’ve got a development situation.' I knew one of them, so they said, 'Maybe this guy Haggard could do something with this.' So I got three weeks' work to supervise a rewrite, which we did. We made Peter’s script much more coherent, turned it into something with a bit more of a beginning, middle and end. And they were very pleased with that so I got the gig. But then unfortunately within about two weeks my love affair with Peter Sellers was over but I had to soldier on. I did soldier on but it was no fun, absolutely no fun. Then just towards the end of the shooting he decided, which had been obvious, that either he would go or I would go so they got rid of me. I didn’t have much choice. So I was retired and he directed for the last week or so. It was pretty much a disaster from beginning to end.

Reception

After the acclaimed movie Being There (1979), this was Peter Sellers' last work. He already looked sick and tired (he would die shortly after filming ended), which notably affected his interpretive quality in a weak and uninteresting plot with other poor performances.

In fact the film was universally panned by critics. Sellers appears unwell and lethargic throughout and his characterizations of Nayland Smith and Fu Manchu are both portrayed in a mostly subdued fashion. It is even probable that Fu Manchu's scenes with his "declining vitality" were a deliberate adaptation of the script to the actor's state of health at the time.

Phil Hardy described the film as a "British atrocity". Orange Coast magazine wrote "Peter Sellers' last hurrah isn't nearly as impressive as his recent Being There. Even in the dual roles ... detective and the devious 168-year- old Fu Manchu, he musters only an occasional bright moment.

Tom Shales of The Washington Post described the film as "an indefensibly inept comedy", adding that "it is hard to name another good actor who ever made so many bad movies as Sellers, a comedian of great gifts but ferociously faulty judgment. Manchu will take its rightful place alongside such colossally ill-advised washouts as Where Does It Hurt?, The Bobo and The Prisoner of Zenda''".

Since release, the film has been criticized for contributing to racist Chinese stereotypes, though the titular character has appeared in many other racist depictions, beginning with the creation of the Fu Manchu character by Rohmer in 1912.

References

Bibliography

External links

  The Fiendish Plot of Dr. Fu Manchu at BFI Screenonline
 
 
 

1980 films
1980s historical comedy films
British historical comedy films
Films about the Federal Bureau of Investigation
Films directed by Peter Sellers
Films directed by Piers Haggard
Films directed by Richard Quine
Films scored by Marc Wilkinson
Films set in 1933
Films set in the Himalayas
Films set in London
Films set in Washington, D.C.
Films shot in London
Films shot in Paris
Orion Pictures films
British parody films
Warner Bros. films
1980s parody films
Fu Manchu films
Films produced by Zev Braun
1980s English-language films
1980s American films
1980s British films